Roath is a district and community to the north-east of the city centre of Cardiff, capital of Wales.
The area is mostly covered by the Plasnewydd electoral ward, and stretches from Adamsdown in the south to Roath Park in the north.

Description

Roath's main shopping streets are Albany Road, City Road, and Wellfield Road. The area is characterised by its several tree-lined avenues and Victorian era terraced streets. Roath houses a very diverse population including a large number of students, being very close to the main university campuses, a large ethnic minority population and many young professionals. Parts of Roath are among the most affluent districts of Cardiff, although subdivision of the large Victorian properties is starting to occur in the areas at the south end of the district.

Its close proximity to the city centre, its number of local amenities, churches, shops and restaurants and public houses and the famous Roath Park make it a popular area to live.

The area has several primary schools, including Albany Primary School, Roath Park Primary School and St Peter's R.C. Primary School.

Community facilities include the YMCA Plas community centre and the Mackintosh Sports Club.

Roath is surrounded by other communities in Cardiff as follows:

History

Y Rhath (Rahat, Raath 13th c.) is likely a development of the Brythonic word for ramparts, cognate with the Irish word ráth (earthwork, fortification). The latinised form of this word (Ratae) appears elsewhere in Roman Britain, such as in Ratae Corieltauvorum. This may suggest a pre-existing Iron Age settlement, likely on the site of the old manor house which was surrounded by earthworks and a ditch for centuries.

Alternatively, it could derive from the name given to the Roman settlement in Cardiff, Ratostabius.

Roath Court is a nineteenth-century villa on the site of the medieval manor house of Roath. Since 1952 it has been a funeral home. Its Georgian portico, designed by Robert Adam in 1766 for Bowood House, Wiltshire, was moved there in 1956.

Roath contains the Church of Saint Margaret of Antioch, built in 1870 in Gothic revival style on the site of an earlier Norman chapel. Designed by Llandaff architect John Prichard on a Greek Cross plan, it was financed by the third Marquess of Bute, in spite of his conversion to Catholicism in 1868. Inside is an opulent mausoleum housing tombs of nine members of the Bute family, including the first marquess and his two wives. The tower of St Margaret's was finally completed in 1926.

Roath once had a railway station on the South Wales Main Line, but this closed in 1917.

Prior to the 2010s the community was known as Plasnewydd, though was renamed as Roath, being a name that was more widely recognised.

Notable buildings

Cardiff University, Queen's Buildings (School of Engineering)
Roath Library
Mansion House, Richmond Road, used as the mayor's residence for much of the 20th century
Shah Jalal Mosque, Crwys Road (formerly Capel Crwys)
St Margaret's Church (and the Bute Mausoleum)
St. Martin's Church, Albany Road
St. Edward's Church, Blenheim Road
St. Peters RFC
The Gate Arts Centre, Keppoch Street
Trinity Methodist Church

Festivals and events
Starting in 2009, the Made in Roath arts festival took place each October. The event showcased art, music, performance and literature in a variety of venues including peoples' homes. The tenth festival took place in 2018. Made in Roath now exists as a community arts organisation that arranges exhibitions and residencies.

Between 2013 and 2016, local organisers Wayne Courtney and Nathan Wyburn hosted the 'Roath Bake Off' festival in St Andrews United Reformed Church, Roath. In December 2018, they announced that the event would be revived for 2019 as part of the campaign to raise funds for the church it was held in.

Notable people
William Cope, 1st Baron Cope, politician and international rugby player
Lionel Fanthorpe
Peter Finch, writer and poet
Boyd Clack, writer, actor and playwright
Brian Hibbard, musician
William Erbery (1604-1654), curate of St Woolos, Newport between 1630 and 1633 then Vicar of St Mary's Church in Cardiff before being forced to leave his post due to his Puritanism. He established the first nonconformist congregation in Cardiff
Maureen Rees, British reality TV star (b. 1942)
John Sankey, 1st Viscount Sankey, Labour politician and Lord Chancellor. Grew up in Castle Road (now City Road).

See also
 Tredegarville

References

Further reading
J. Childs. Roath, Splott and Adamsdown. The History Press. 1995.

External links

RoathCardiff.net, Community news and information about Roath in Cardiff
Geograph.co.uk, photos of Roath and surrounding area
Roathcardiff.com, History and photos of Roath
Madeinroath.com, Arts festival and community project in Roath
roathlocalhistorysociety.org, Local history society focussing on the Ecclesiastical Parish of Roath

 
Communities in Cardiff
Districts of Cardiff